Fielding Patrick "Pat" Hambright II (born January 4, 1967) is an American journalist.

References

External links
 

1967 births
American male journalists
American television reporters and correspondents
Colorado Mesa University alumni
Journalists from California
Journalists from Colorado
Journalists from Nevada
Television anchors from Sacramento, California
Living people